Avteq was an Australian locomotive manufacturer.

History
Avteq constructed 12 VL class locomotives between February 2007 and March 2009 for Chicago Freight Car Leasing Australia from a factory in Sunshine.

References

Defunct locomotive manufacturers of Australia
Australian companies established in 2006
Australian companies disestablished in 2009
Vehicle manufacturing companies established in 2006
Vehicle manufacturing companies disestablished in 2009
Manufacturing companies based in Melbourne